Changra may refer to: 
Çankırı, a city in Turkey, Çankırı Province
Çankırı Province,  a province of Turkey
Changra, Nepal